The Seongsu Bridge disaster occurred on the morning of October 21, 1994, when a section of the upper truss of the Seongsu Bridge collapsed onto the Han River in Seoul, South Korea, killing 32 people and injuring 17 others. A combination of faulty welding, rusted extension hinges, and insufficient maintenance resulted in the structural failure of the bridge.

Seventeen Seoul Metropolitan Government, Dongbu Corporation, and  officials would eventually be convicted in connection to the collapse. Mayor of Seoul  and his successor  both resigned in response to the disaster. On November 10, 2000, the Dong Ah Group, the parent company for Dong Ah Construction, filed for bankruptcy and the company dissolved on May 11, 2001.

The collapse was part of a string of disasters during the modernization of South Korea, including the fire of a sightseeing boat, the sinking of MV Seohae, the crash of Asiana Airlines Flight 733, the Gupo Station rail accident, the 1995 Daegu gas explosions, and the Sampoong Department Store collapse.

Background 

At the time, foreign firms were excluded from construction contracts, stretching thin domestic construction companies who faced increasing demand as a result of military dictator Park Chung-hee's development plan south of the Han River. The bridge was praised for its focus on its aesthetics in addition to functional considerations, setting it apart from other bridges built at the time. The bridge became the 11th bridge constructed over the Han River and alleviated traffic on the nearby Yeongdong and Hannam bridges.

Two years earlier, the Second Haengju Bridge collapsed during construction with no casualties. At the time, bids for construction projects frequently went to companies that promised the fastest construction, incentivizing cheap and rushed construction at the expense of safety. Dong Ah Construction's bid for the Seongsu Bridge's construction contract was half the price of its expected cost at the time. The rushed construction of the bridge was attributed as a negative consequence of South Korea's "ppalli ppalli" culture.

The Seongsu Bridge linked the Seongdong District north of the river to the southern Gangnam District and was one of the busiest bridges in Seoul. Following the development of the Gangnam region, the number of vehicles using the bridge increased exponentially to 160,000 vehicles per day. The bridge connected to the Seoul Olympic Highway to the south. During the 15 years from its construction to its collapse, the Seongsu Bridge had never been subject to a detailed inspection because it was less than 20 years old and inspections had focused solely on aging structures.

Collapse 

Repairs for the bridge had been scheduled for that day but were postponed due to bad weather.

On Friday, October 21, at 6:00 a.m., drivers filed a report after seeing cracks in the bridge, but the city government dismissed the reports, saying that the crack had been repaired through the installation of the steel plate.

Survivors of the collapse compared the sound of the collapse to thunder. The police van carried 11 police and auxiliary police officers, that were selected as model officers for  celebrations that day. Heavy rain the night before the collapse reportedly reduced the number of vehicles on the road at the time. The collapse sent two cars and the police van down with the bridge, while an additional two cars fell into the river. The collapse caused the rear of the bus to tilt over backwards and plummet onto its roof, crumpling to half its size.

Victims 
Thirty-two people were killed in the disaster including 29 victims on the Number 16 bus, which held 31 people when it fell. Two of the victims on the bus survived the fall, but died waiting for first responders. Among the victims was 40-year-old Adele Aida, an undocumented immigrant from the Philippines, who was traveling to a meeting of Filipinos in Korea. Initial reports incorrectly reported over 40 deaths after police either mistakenly combined the list of the dead and the injured or doubled the number of deaths.

Rescue 

The 11 police and auxiliary officers in the police van that fell with the bridge became the first to respond to the disaster. The officers quickly undressed and used their clothes to tie a rope and warm other victims of the disaster, saving a total of 10 drowning people. First responders arrived more than 20 minutes after the collapse, and rescue operations began at 8:10 a.m. KST. The late response of the first responders drew public ire and was the result of call center employees mistaking emergency calls for prank calls. These rescue operations were carried out by 30 officers and members of the Seoul Metropolitan Police and the Han River Patrol and consisted of two helicopters, three barges and 10 yawls.

In response to the collapse, a total of 1,500 people were mobilized from the Seoul Metropolitan Police Agency, the Korean Armed Forces, and the Seoul Metropolitan Fire Service. The rescue team included 150 underwater exploration special forces from the fire service. Rescue efforts were hampered by rain, tides, and heavy traffic.

Investigation 
Officials initially stated that they believed the collapse occurred as a result of long-term excessive load on the bridge, culminating in the fracture of a rusted connection hinge. Overloaded vehicles carrying loads greater than their maximum capacity were regularly passing through the bridge. This led to a crackdown on overloaded vehicles over the Hangang Bridge out of fear of a similar collapse. Investigations by the Korean Broadcasting System the next day found that the Seongsu Bridge, along with the Dongho Bridge and the Hangang Bridge, suffered from rushed construction, noting that severely rusted steel on the bridges had been painted over, bolts were missing from the bridges, and segments of the bridges were only welded on the outside. Following the collapse, it was also revealed that the Seoul Metropolitan Government had planned to expand the bridge from four to five lanes through a reversible lane.

On June 30, 1995, the Seoul District Prosecutors' Office, in collaboration with the Korean Society of Civil Engineers, would release the conclusions of their investigation in a white paper. The white paper concluded that the primary cause of the collapse was the poor welding of the bridge and manufacturing defects in the pins connecting the vertical trusses of the bridge. Radiographic testing carried out following the collapse found that 110 out of the 111 connections in the bridge were filled with defects and that welds often only penetrated 2 to 8mm when the beams were 18mm thick. At the time, due to the lack of domestic technical skills in steel plate welding, Dong Ah Construction hired a Zainichi Korean to manage the Bupyeo steel factory. However, when his insistence on inspecting the welds led to delays, he was fired.

The white paper would further conclude that the Seoul Metropolitan Government and the Dongbu Corporation had failed to maintain the bridge, and even visual inspections and basic repairs had not been carried out. Despite being designed for loads no heavier than 36.3 tons, the bridge regularly carried loads greater than 47.3 tons, resulting in the creation of fatigue cracks in the structure of the bridge. At the time, only four bridges in Seoul were built to withstand loads greater than 42 tons. In addition, the frequent use of inexperienced subcontractors, the lack of a system to monitor discrepancies in design and construction, the management of construction by non-technical officials, and rampant corruption were all listed as exacerbating factors in the collapse. Maintenance of the bridge was neglected due to limited fiscal resources, and connecting pins used in the bridge had become heavily rusted. While the white paper found no flaws in the proposed design of the bridge, as a result of the poor construction, the investigation concluded that "the risk of collapse was 100% and the collapse of the Seongsu Bridge was inevitable." The original white paper was criticized for publishing the names, genders, resident registration numbers, addresses, and occupations of the victims, omitting only the personal information of the minors and eleven police officers. In addition, the exact compensation received by each of the deceased victims' families was released in the original white paper.

Legal proceedings 

Immediately following the collapse, prosecutors launched a criminal investigation into Dong Ah Construction. Four days later, prosecutors found damage reports submitted in February and April to the Seoul Metropolitan Government by the Dongbu Corporation, which was responsible for bridge maintenance and repair. These reports stated the steel girders supporting the Seongsu Bridge were in urgent need of repair and included photographs of the damage on the bridge. On October 26, prosecutors arrested the head of the city government's construction office and six other Seoul City officials for falsely reporting that the bridge was safe without performing the required daily checks. In the end, the Seoul District Prosecutor's Office's investigation would lead to 17 arrests in connection to the collapse: four Seoul Metropolitan Government officials, seven Dongbu Corporation officials, and six Dong Ah Construction officials. Prosecutors decided against arresting former mayor of Seoul , stating that they did not find evidence that he was ever informed of the imminent collapse.

The 17 defendants were tried collectively at the 7th Seoul Criminal District Court under Judge Kim Dong-hwan, and proceedings began on December 15, 1994. Defendants from Dong Ah Construction were charged with criminal negligence resulting in death, injury, the obstruction of traffic, and an automobile accident. Defendants from the Seoul Metropolitan Government and the Dongbu Corporation were additionally charged with forgery of public documents, use of forged public documents, forgery of private documents, and use of forged private documents. Defendants from Dong Ah Construction argued that the five-year statute of limitations for negligent manslaughter had passed because the bridge had been built 15 years ago. However, the judge ruled that the statute of limitations for criminal negligence began on the date of the accident and not the date of construction, a decision appellate courts would later uphold. The officials testified that they were not aware of any poor construction. On April 20, 1995, the district court convicted 16 defendants while acquitting construction site manager Shin Dong-hyun, ruling that Shin was not in a position to be aware of any defects in the welding of the bridge. Sentences varied from ten months to three years imprisonment, but were suspended by the judge who argued that the defendants had already served six months and should not be punished further for poor construction that had been carried out 15 years ago. Seoul District Prosecutors immediately appealed the decisions, and the case was taken to the Seoul Central District Court.

The criminal appeal was held under Judge Han Jung-duk. On June 11, 1997, the appeals court reversed the lower court's ruling, convicting Shin Dong-hyun and sentencing him to two years imprisonment. Former production manager of Bupyeo Steel factory Park Hyo-su was sentenced to two years imprisonment, having previously been serving a suspended sentence of five years' probation from three years imprisonment. Yeo Yong-won, the former director of the Dongbu Construction office in Seoul, was sentenced to one year six months imprisonment, having previously been serving a suspended sentence of four years' probation from two years imprisonment. Sentences for all other defendants were reversed to their original lengths of ten months to three years imprisonment, two to five years' probation, and fines of 5 million won each (equivalent to ₩ million in ). In December 1995, between the decision of the first court and the appeals court, an amendment to the law reduced the punishment for forging public documents to a fine. In particular, the former head of the city's road construction office Lee Shin-young was the only defendant not convicted with negligent manslaughter. Thus, in June 1997, Lee's sentence was reduced from two years' probation, suspended from one year imprisonment, to a fine of 5 million won.

The former head of the city's road maintenance office Kim Jae-seok was sentenced to one year and six months imprisonment and three years probation. Construction supervisors for the city of Seoul Kim Seok-gi and Lee Woo-yeon were sentenced to one year and six months imprisonment and three years' probation while Lee was sentenced to one year imprisonment and two years' probation. Former Vice President Kim Myeong-nyeom and public affairs manager Jang Rae-ik of Dong Ah Construction were both sentenced to two years imprisonment and five years' probation. Technical director of Bupyeo steel factory Lee Kyu-dae was sentenced to three years imprisonment and five years' probation.

The defendants appealed the ruling, and the case was taken to the Korean Supreme Court. In South Korea, the Supreme Court can only consider appeals with regards to the law and cannot alter sentencing. Defendants argued that they were not individually responsible for the bridge collapse because no individual action had caused the bridge to collapse. Between the appeals court ruling and the Supreme Court ruling, one defendant died. On November 28, 1997, the Supreme Court upheld the convictions of all 16 defendants and accepted the lower court's ruling that the Dong Ah Construction Industrial Company was guilty of criminal negligence in its poor construction of the bridge.

Aftermath 
An estimated 5,000 vehicles had to be redirected onto arterial roads, causing traffic congestion lasting until 11 p.m. that night. Following the disaster, Prime Minister Lee Yung-dug offered his resignation, but President Kim Young-sam declined, stating that changing safety measures was more important than changing people. In contrast, the resignation offer of Lee Won-jong, the Mayor of Seoul, was accepted at 7 p.m. that day. He would be replaced by Governor of North Gyeongsang Province  on October 31 before being replaced again by Choi Byung-ryeol 11 days later, when it was revealed that Woo had been  when internal reports had questioned the safety of the bridge.

Kim held a meeting with his cabinet on October 23 calling for the elimination of deficient companies from the construction industry and the revision of laws to increase the depth and breadth of inspections. The next day, Kim appeared on national television in his second official apology of his term. In his address, he stated that the rapid development of South Korea since the 1960s had brought both positive and negative outcomes, and that his government would promise to minimize all risks to Koreans. He then apologized, stating that the disaster was the result of his own lack of virtue and that he recognized the issues in the management system brought to light by the collapse. Nevertheless, the Sampoong Department Store collapse would occur nine months later, becoming the deadliest peacetime disaster in South Korean history. The recurrence of major disasters during the Kim Young-Sam administration gave his government the popular nickname the "". In response to the bridge disaster, opposition parties in the National Assembly called on members of Kim's cabinet to resign, raising motions of no confidence which were voted down.

The Seoul Citizen's Day celebrations set for the week after the bridge collapse were postponed.

Compensation 
The Cabinet paid 4 million won (equivalent to ₩ million in ) in compensation to each of the families of the 32 people who died in the incident. In addition, the Cabinet paid for the medical expenses of the injured and compensated them in consultation with their families, with the exception of the police officers. The Temporary Workers Friendly Association of Korea and the Lotte Welfare Foundation also provided compensation to the family of Adele Aida through the Philippine embassy. Many of those who survived the disaster have reported to have had permanent psychological trauma from the incident.

Impact 
The collapse prompted the Seoul Metropolitan Government to begin a more thorough safety assessment of the 14 other bridges that crossed the Han River and into whether the Seongsu Bridge could be safely fixed. As a result of these investigations, the Dangsan Railway Bridge was closed for reconstruction on December 31, 1996, being re-opened to the public on November 22, 1999.

On January 5, 1995, in response to the disaster, the Special Act on the Safety Management of Structures was passed, which expanded the frequency and scope of inspections. In July of that year, the Disaster Control Act would be passed, a response to the deadly collapses of the Seongsu Bridge and the Sampoong Department Store.

Although the city government initially planned to repair and reopen the Seongsu Bridge to traffic within three months, this plan was reversed following public outcry. Starting on April 26, 1995, the remainder of the bridge was dismantled, and construction for the new bridge began in March 1996 under Hyundai Engineering & Construction. Construction for the replacement bridge would cost 78 billion won (equivalent to ₩ billion in ), about 6.8 times the original price. The new bridge was opened to the public on July 3, 1997, by Mayor Cho Soon, and a memorial was held on the bridge.

Memorial 
The Memorial Stone for the Victims of the Seongsu Bridge Disaster was erected on October 21, 1997, by the families of the Seongsu Bridge disaster victims. The memorial commemorates the victims of the disaster and aims to raise awareness on the safe management of public infrastructure. The memorial is located in the middle of Gangbyeon Expressway on the north side of the bridge, and has been criticized for its inaccessibility by foot. In August 1999, a father of a Muhak Girls' High School student who died in the Seongsu Bridge disaster died by suicide in front of the memorial. Memorials are held at the stone every year, and a 20th anniversary memorial service was held at the stone in 2014.

In popular culture 
DJ DOC's second studio album  (1995) contains the tracks "Breaking News" and "Seongsu Bridge" which were made in response to the disaster.
The rock band N.EX.T.'s third album,  (1995), mentions the Seongsu Bridge collapse in its criticism of South Korea's development.
The Seongsu Bridge disaster was the subject of Jeong Yoon-cheol's 1997 debut short film Memorial Photographing.
The manhwa series  (1998–2003) by Yoon Tae-ho was based off of the collapse of the Seongsu Bridge.
The 2018 film House of Hummingbird revolves around the Seongsu Bridge disaster as a major plot point.

Gallery

See also 
List of man-made disasters in South Korea
List of bridge failures
I-35W Mississippi River Bridge Collapse
Daegu subway fire
Sinking of MV Sewol
2021 Gwangju building collapse
Gwangju Hwajeong I-Park exterior wall collapse

Notes

References

External links 
White paper released by the Seoul District Prosecutors' Office

Man-made disasters in South Korea
1990s in Seoul
1994 disasters in South Korea
1994 in South Korea
October 1994 events in Asia
Disasters in Seoul
Seongdong District
Gangnam District
Corporate scandals
Collapsed buildings and structures
Disasters
1994 road incidents
Bridge disasters caused by construction error
Bridge disasters in South Korea
Buildings and structures demolished in 1994
Buildings and structures demolished in 1996
History of South Korea
History of Seoul
Transport disasters in South Korea